New York Red Bulls II is an American professional soccer team based in Montclair, New Jersey. They are the reserve team of the New York Red Bulls and play in MLS Next Pro, the third tier in the American soccer pyramid.

History
Red Bull New York II were founded on January 21, 2015, when the New York Red Bulls acquired the rights to start a USL club. Red Bulls II competes in the second tier of American soccer and serves as a reserve side for the first team as well as a developmental stage for young prospects and academy players. The club follows in the footsteps of many MLS clubs who created USL sides to help promote youth development throughout the nation.

It was announced on March 2, 2015, that former MetroStars and Red Bulls player, John Wolyniec would be the club's new head coach. Wolyniec previously served as an assistant coach to the senior team and the academy. Former Red Bulls defender, Ibrahim Sekagya will also serve on his coaching staff.

On March 19, 2015, the soccer club announced the signing of their first-ever player, and former academy standout, Tyler Adams. Following their first signing, the club's first roster consisted of senior team players who were loaned down, draft picks, academy players and local trialists. A week later, on March 28, the club played in their inaugural match, drawing 0–0 against the Rochester Rhinos. Senior team loanee, Anatole Abang scored the club's first ever goal in a 4–1 victory against Toronto FC II, marking the first victory in club history.

A New York Red Bulls team composed mostly of NYRB II players defeated Chelsea F.C. in a friendly on July 22, 2015.

After spending the majority of the 2015 and 2016 season playing at Red Bull Arena, the club announced on May 10, 2016 that their new home field would be at Montclair State University's MSU Soccer Park at Pittser Field starting in 2017.

The club won their first ever trophy on September 7, 2016 claiming the Regular Season Title (the equivalent of the Supporters' Shield) 4–1 victory at Harrisburg City Islanders. On October 23, Red Bulls II won their first USL Cup after a 5–1 victory against Swope Park Rangers at Red Bull Arena.

For the abbreviated 2020 USL Championship season, due to the global COVID-19 pandemic, Red Bulls II are playing home matches at Red Bull Arena with no fans in attendance.

On February 7, 2022, the club appointed Gary Lewis as new head coach.

MLS Next Pro
MLS announced that it would be one of the new eight teams to join MLS Next Pro in 2023.

Club culture

Supporters
The team-recognized, fan organized supporters group of Red Bulls II is The Rampage, founded by members of the New York Red Bulls supporters club Viking Army.

Team records

Overall records

* Regular season title winners

 As of the 2016 season, MLS reserve sides are not allowed to compete in the Lamar Hunt U.S. Open Cup.

Head coach record

Includes USL Regular season, USL Play-offs and U.S. Lamar Hunt Open Cup

Player honors

Players

Roster

Player statistics

Top appearances

Bold signifies current Red Bulls II player

Top goalscorers

Bold signifies current Red Bulls II player

Honors
USL Cup Championship
Winners : 2016
USL Regular Season
Winners: 2016
Eastern Conference
Winners (Playoffs): 2016
Winners (Regular season): 2016

See also 

 Soccer in New York City
New York Red Bulls U-23

References

External links

 

 
 
Association football clubs established in 2015
Soccer clubs in New Jersey
Former USL Championship teams
MLS Next Pro teams
Reserve soccer teams in the United States
2015 establishments in New Jersey